Eugene Martinez (born 1957), also known as Eui Martinez, is an English retired footballer who made nearly 200 appearances in the Football League as a left-winger.

Career
Martinez played for Harrogate Town, Bradford City, Rochdale, Newport County and Northampton Town.

After football
Martinez runs Chase Advanced Technologies, a family-run electronics firm, in Bradford.

References

1957 births
Living people
Sportspeople from Chelmsford
English footballers
Bradford City A.F.C. players
Rochdale A.F.C. players
Newport County A.F.C. players
Northampton Town F.C. players
Association football midfielders